Pace University is a private university with its main campus in New York City and secondary campuses in Westchester County, New York. It was established in 1906 by the brothers Homer St. Clair Pace and Charles A. Pace as a business school. Pace enrolls about 13,000 students in bachelor's, master's and doctoral programs.

Pace University offers about 100 majors at its six colleges and schools, including the College of Health Professions, the Dyson College of Arts and Sciences, Elisabeth Haub School of Law, Lubin School of Business, School of Education, and Seidenberg School of Computer Science and Information Systems. It also offers a Master of Fine Arts in acting through The Actors Studio Drama School and is home to the Inside the Actors Studio television show. The university runs a women's justice center in Yonkers, a business incubator and is affiliated with the public school Pace High School.

Pace University originally operated out of the New York Tribune Building in New York City, and spread as the Pace Institute, operating in several major U.S. cities. In the 1920s, the institution divested facilities outside New York, maintaining its Lower Manhattan location. It purchased its first permanent home in Manhattan's 41 Park Row in 1951, and opened its first Westchester campus in 1963. Pace opened its largest building, 1 Pace Plaza, in 1969. Four years later, it became a university.

History

In 1906, brothers Homer St. Clair Pace and Charles Ashford Pace founded the firm of Pace & Pace to operate their schools of accountancy and business. Taking a loan of $600, the Pace brothers rented a classroom on one of the floors of the New York Tribune Building, today the site of the One Pace Plaza complex. The Paces taught the first class of 13 men and women. The school grew rapidly, and moved several times around Lower Manhattan.

The Pace brothers' school was soon incorporated as Pace Institute, and expanded nationwide, offering courses in accountancy and business law in several U.S. cities. Some 4,000 students were taking the Pace brothers' courses in YMCAs in the New York-New Jersey area. The Pace Standardized Course in Accounting was also offered in Boston, Baltimore, Washington, D.C., Buffalo, Cleveland, Detroit, Milwaukee, Grand Rapids, Kansas City, St. Louis, Denver, San Francisco, Los Angeles, Portland, and Seattle. In the 1920s, concerned about quality control at distant locations, the Pace brothers divested their private schools outside New York and subsequently devoted their attention to the original school in Lower Manhattan, eventually to become one of the campuses of Pace University. Pace Institute in Washington, D.C. later became Benjamin Franklin University (now part of The George Washington University). In 1927 the school moved to the newly completed Transportation Building at 225 Broadway, and remained there until the 1950s.

After Charles died in 1940 and Homer in 1942, Homer's son Robert S. Pace became the new president of Pace. In 1947, Pace Institute was approved for college status by the New York State Board of Regents. In 1951, the college purchased its first campus building: 41 Park Row in Lower Manhattan. The building, a New York City designated landmark, was the late-19th-century headquarters of The New York Times. In 1963, the Pleasantville Campus was established using land and buildings donated by the then-president of General Foods and Pace alumnus and trustee Wayne Marks and his wife Helen.

In 1966, U.S. Vice President Hubert Humphrey and New York City Mayor John Lindsay broke ground for the One Pace Plaza Civic Center complex, with then Pace president Edward J. Mortola. The former New York Tribune Building at 154 Nassau Street, across from 41 Park Row, was demolished to make way for the new building complex.

The New York State Board of Regents approved Pace College's petition for university status in 1973. In September 1976, Pace began offering courses in Midtown Manhattan in the Equitable Life Assurance Company building (now AXA Equitable Life Insurance Company) on Avenue of the Americas, and moved once before moving to its current location in 1997. Briarcliff College was acquired in 1977 and became the Briarcliff campus. A graduate center was opened in 1982 in White Plains, New York, and in 1987 the Graduate Center moved to the newly built Westchester Financial Center complex in downtown business district of White Plains; which at the time of its opening, Pace's graduate computer science program was the first nationally accredited graduate program in the state of New York.

In 1994, all undergraduate programs in White Plains were consolidated to the Pleasantville-Briarcliff campus, and the White Plains campus on North Broadway was given to the law school; resulting in the university's Westchester undergraduate programs in Pleasantville and its Westchester graduate programs in White Plains. Finally in 1997, Pace purchased the World Trade Institute at 1 World Trade Center from the Port Authority of New York and New Jersey.

On March 5, 2006, Pace students, alumni, faculty, and staff from all campuses convened on the Pleasantville Campus in a university-wide Centennial Kick-Off Celebration; there was a Pace Centennial train, provided free of charge by the Metropolitan Transportation Authority (MTA), to take Pace's New York City students, alumni, faculty and staff to Pace's Pleasantville campus. Former President Bill Clinton received an honorary doctorate of humane letters from Pace during the ceremony, which was held at the Goldstein Health, Fitness and Recreation Center. Following reception of the honorary degree, he addressed the students, faculty, alumni and staff of Pace, officially kicking off the Centennial anniversary of the university.

Since her last visit in celebration of Black History Month in 1989, Dr. Maya Angelou again visited the Pace community on October 4, 2006, in celebration of Pace's Centennial. Two days later, on October 6, 2006, (Pace's Founders Day) Pace University rang the NASDAQ stock market opening bell in Midtown Manhattan to mark the end of the 14-month centennial celebration.

On May 15, 2007, Pace University President David A. Caputo announced his early retirement from the presidency on June 3, 2007. The Board of Trustees of Pace University appointed Pace Law School dean Stephen J. Friedman to the position of interim president. Friedman has been dean and professor of law at Pace since 2004. He has also served as commissioner of the Securities and Exchange Commission and as co-chairman of Debevoise & Plimpton. Friedman retired as President of Pace University in July 2017. In 2015, in an effort to consolidate Pace University's Westchester campuses into a single location, Pace University sold the Briarcliff campus.

The former president of Oberlin College, Marvin Krislov, was appointed president of Pace University in February 2017.

In February 2017, Pace University embarked on a $190 million renovation process known as the 'Master Plan'. Phase 1, which included the One Pace Plaza and 41 Park Row buildings. was completed by a ribbon cutting event on January 28, 2019. Additional future phases include a vertical expansion of One Pace Plaza to create an additional  of academic space, relocating the Lubin School of Business, moving administrative offices from 41 Park Row, and modernizing the facade of One Pace Plaza.

Academics

Admissions
Pace University's 2019 undergraduate admission acceptance rate was 75.9%, with admitted students having an average high school GPA of 3.4, an average SAT composite score of 1160 out of 1600 (570 Math, 590 Reading & Writing), and an average ACT composite score of 25 out of 36.

Rankings

The 2020 edition of U.S. News & World Report ranked Pace as 202nd among universities in the United States.

Schools and colleges
The university consists of the following schools, each with a graduate and undergraduate division:
 The College of Health Professions (2011)
 Lienhard School of Nursing (1966) is ranked by U.S. News & World Report at 79th among graduate nursing schools.
 Dyson College of Arts and Sciences (1966)
 Pace School of Performing Arts (PPA) 
 Lubin School of Business (1906) Among fewer than three percent of global business schools with dual accreditation from AACSB International.
 School of Education (1966)
 Seidenberg School of Computer Science and Information Systems (1983), named in 2005 for Verizon Chairman/CEO & Pace alumnus Ivan Seidenberg. Susan M. Merritt served as founding dean from its inception in 1983 for 25 years, the longest of any dean at Pace.
 Pforzheimer Honors College (2003)
 Adult and Continuing Education (formerly known as University College 1979–1984; School of Continuing Education 1968–1979)
 World Trade Institute of Pace University (purchased from the Port Authority of New York and New Jersey in 1997 - originally located on the 55th floor of 1 World Trade Center until September 11, 2001, reopened in 2003, closed in 2005.)
 The Actors Studio MFA program. The Michael Schimmel Center for the Arts is home to the television show Inside the Actors Studio previously hosted by James Lipton, and once hosted Tony Randall's National Actors Theatre.

Pace University was ranked tied for 202nd among national universities by U.S. News & World Report in 2020, and tied for 34th for "Top Performers on Social Mobility". In 2015, Pace University was ranked #19 in New York State by average professor salaries.

Campuses
Pace University campuses are located in New York City and Westchester County. The university's shuttle service provides transportation between the New York City and Pleasantville campuses. Furthermore, Pace University has a high school located just ten blocks away from the university's New York City Campus (see Pace University High School).

New York City

The New York City campus is located in the Civic Center of Lower Manhattan, next to the Financial District and New York Downtown Hospital.

The campus is walking distance to well-known New York City sites including Wall Street, the World Trade Center, World Financial Center, South Street Seaport, Chinatown and Little Italy. The main building, One Pace Plaza, is a two-square-block building bounded by Gold, Nassau, Spruce, and Frankfort Streets, directly adjacent to the Manhattan entrance ramp of the Brooklyn Bridge. Located directly across from City Hall, the One Pace Plaza complex houses most of the classrooms, administrative offices, a  student union, a 750-seat community theater, and an 18-floor high-rise residence hall (known as "Maria's Tower"). 41 Park Row was the 19th-century headquarters of The New York Times, and carrying on that legacy the building today houses the campus' student newspaper The Pace Press, as well as student organization offices, the Pace University Press, faculty offices, the university's bookstore, and classrooms. 41 Park Row also houses the Haskins Laboratories,  of Dr. Seymour H. Hutner, where medical experiments are held, like the Green tea extract study in the international media. The buildings of 157 William Street, 161 William Street, and 163 William Street were acquired by Pace following the September 11 attacks to make up for loss of the entire 55th floor, in the North Tower of the World Trade Center which used to house Pace University's World Trade Institute and World Trade Conference Center (See the section below entitled September 11, 2001). The Willam Street buildings house classrooms, offices of the Seidenberg School of Computer Science & Information Systems, the School of Education, the College of Health Professions, the university's business incubators, along with Pace's Downtown Conference Center where the e.MBA residency sessions are held (Pace also has leased office space in 156 William Street). Pace has residence halls at 182 Broadway and 33 Beekman Street. The 33 Beekman Street building is the tallest student residential building in the world. Pace also leases residence accommodations at the new state-of-the-art residence at 55 John Street, also in Lower Manhattan. Pace also offers classes in midtown Manhattan in the art deco Fred F. French Building on at 551 Fifth Avenue.

In January 2019, Pace completed a $45 million renovation of One Pace Plaza and the adjoining 41 Park Row.

Westchester

Pleasantville Campus

Classes began in Pleasantville in Westchester County, New York in 1963. The campus today consists of the former estate of then Vice Chairman of General Foods Corporation, Wayne Marks (Class of 1928) - previously belonging to 18th century noted physician Dr. George C. S. Choate (who gave his name to a pond and a house on the campus.)

Located on the  campus is the Environmental Center, constructed around the remnants of a 1779 farmhouse. The center, which is dedicated to the environmental studies program, provides office and classroom space; it houses the university's animals such as chicken, goats, sheep, pigs, and raptors. As part of the Pleasantville Master Plan, this Environmental Center was expanded and relocated to the back of campus. Two brand new residence halls, Elm Hall and Alumni Hall, were constructed in the center of campus, in its place and the Kessel Student Center was remodeled.

Elisabeth Haub School of Law

Nestled in between the Cross-Westchester Expressway (I-287) and NY Route 22 (North Broadway), the Law School is situated on a spacious  landscaped suburban campus with a mix of historic and modern buildings.

In 2020, U.S. News & World Report ranked the law school's Advanced Certificate in Environmental Law program #3, and gave the law school a general rank of #136.

On the Law School's campus is the recognized Pace Environmental Litigation Clinic where adjunct professor emeritus of Environmental Law, and alumnus of Pace, Robert F. Kennedy Jr. served as co-director before retirement. Also on the campus is the New York State Judicial Institute, the United States' first statewide center for training and research for all judges and justices of the New York State Unified Court System. Frequent Pace shuttle service is provided between the Law School campus and the White Plains Station of the Metro-North Railroad for many law students who commute from New York City and throughout the state. Stephen J. Friedman, former commissioner of the Securities and Exchange Commission and former co-chairman of Debevoise & Plimpton, is the immediate past dean of Pace Law School.

Other properties

Pace University High School

Pace University established a public high school and opened its doors to its first class in September 2004. Pace High School is in New York City school district Region 9, and shares a building with Middle School 131 at 100 Hester Street in Lower Manhattan, 10 blocks away from the university's New York City campus.

SCI² business incubators
In the fall of 2004, Pace University opened two business incubators to help early-stage companies grow in New York City in Lower Manhattan and Yonkers. SCI², (which stands for Second Century Innovation and Ideas, Corp.) maintains accelerator sites in 163 William Street in Lower Manhattan and in the  NValley Technology Center complex at 470 Nepperhan Avenue in Yonkers.

Women's Justice Center at the Westchester County Family Court-Yonkers
In 2001, the Women's Justice Center of Pace Law School opened a second site at the Westchester County Family Court in Yonkers, New York (the first being on the law school campus at the 27 Crane Avenue house). The Westchester County Family Court in Yonkers is one of three family courts in Westchester County. The Yonkers office of the Women's Justice Center is located at the Westchester Family Court, 53 South Broadway in Yonkers.

International Disarmament Institute
The International Disarmament Institute is a center for teaching and studying worldwide disarmament, arms control and non-proliferation. Matthew Bolton, the director of the institute, worked on The International Campaign to Abolish Nuclear Weapons, which won the Nobel Peace Prize in 2017.

Theater and the arts

The Michael Schimmel Center for the Arts is the principal theatre of Pace University and is located at the university's New York City campus in Lower Manhattan. The 750-seat Michael Schimmel Center for the Arts is home to the television show Inside the Actors Studio hosted by James Lipton and previously the home of the National Actors Theatre, a theatre company founded by actor Tony Randall who was in residence. The National Actors Theatre was the only professional theatre company housed in a university in New York City. Theater productions at Pace have included such stars as Tony Randall, Al Pacino, Steve Buscemi, Dominic Chianese, Billy Crudup, Charles Durning, Paul Giamatti, John Goodman, Chazz Palminteri, Linda Emond, Len Cariou, Roberta Maxwell, and Jeff Goldblum. Pace is also one of the venues for the Tribeca Film Festival, the Tribeca Theater Festival, the New York International Fringe Festival (FringeNYC), The River To River Festival (New York City's largest free-to-the-public summer festival), and Grammy Career Day of Grammy in the Schools. The Woodward Hall 135-seat theater at the campus at Briarcliff Manor in Westchester is home to the Hudson Stage Company.

Athletics

Pace's sports teams are called the Setters; the university's mascot is the Setter. Pace University sponsors fourteen intercollegiate varsity sports. Men's sports include baseball, basketball, cross country, football, lacrosse and swimming & diving; while women's sports include basketball, cheerleading, cross country, dance, field hockey, soccer, softball, swimming & diving and volleyball. Its affiliations include the National Collegiate Athletic Association (NCAA) Division II and the Northeast-10 Conference (NE-10). The school's official colors are blue and gold.

September 11, 2001
On the day of the terrorist attacks of September 11, 2001, Pace University, four blocks from Ground Zero, lost 4 students and over 40 alumni. Students were made to leave classes and evacuate to other locations in One Pace Plaza at 10:00 a.m. The New York City EMT cleared out the Admissions Lobby and made it into a triage center for victims of the attack. Many of the patients were New York City police officers, firefighters and other emergency workers. Debris and about three inches (7.5 cm) of dust and ashes laid over the Pace New York City campus area and local streets. None of Pace's buildings were damaged except in the World Trade Center; Pace lost the entire 55th floor,  in the North Tower of the World Trade Center which used to house Pace University's World Trade Institute and the Pace University World Trade Conference Center (now the Downtown Conference Center). A memorial to students and alumni who lost their lives on September 11 stands on all three campuses of Pace University. A gift from the American Kennel Club, a statue of a German Shepherd dog stands in front of One Pace Plaza (as of Fall 2007) to commemorate Pace's support as a triage center on September 11.

Notable alumni

Notable graduates and former students at Pace include:
 Philip Abramo, American financial fraudster, white collar crime boss and DeCavalcante crime family Caporegime, known as "the King of Wall Street"
 Mike Adenuga, CEO Globacom
 Ailee, Korean-American singer currently promoting in South Korea
 Olivia Anakwe, fashion model; B.A. in psychology
 Stephanie Andujar, actress; Precious; Orange Is the New Black
 Nathaniel Barnes, former Liberian Ambassador to the United States
 Yancy Butler, actress
 Frank Calderoni, CEO, Anaplan
 Telfar Clemens, fashion designer
 James E. Davis, former Member of the New York City Council
 Stephanie Del Valle, musician, model, Miss World 2016
 Dominique Fishback, actress, known for her role on HBO's The Deuce
 Richard Grasso, chairman and CEO (1995–2003) of the New York Stock Exchange
 Katie Henney, actress, starred in Felicity: An American Girl Adventure as Elizabeth Cole
 Kathleen Herles, voice actress, original voice of Dora on Dora the Explorer
 Joseph Ianniello, president and acting CEO, CBS Corporation
 Mel Karmazin, CEO (2004-2012), Sirius Satellite Radio; former president and CEO, CBS; former COO, Viacom
 Asher Levine, fashion designer
 Joy Mangano, inventor & entrepreneur
 Avi Mizrahi, an Israeli Defense Force, major general
 Lalit Modi, former commissioner of the Indian Premier League
 Tim Morehouse, fencer, Silver Medal winner in Men's Team Sabre at the 2008 Summer Olympics
 Olga Nolla, poet, writer, journalist, professor
 Fred Ohebshalom, New York real estate developer
 Kash Patel, former chief of staff to the United States Secretary of Defense
 Rachael Ray, personality & TV cook, studied at Pace Pleasantville 1986–1987
 Rossana Rosado, journalist & Secretary of State of New York
 Ken Rudin, radio journalist and political editor for National Public Radio (NPR)
 Felix Sater, convicted felon, real estate developer and entrepreneur, known for work on Trump SoHo, Midtown Miami, and the proposed Trump Tower Moscow
 Ivan G. Seidenberg '81, Former president & CEO, Verizon
 Sam Smith, former NBA writer at the Chicago Tribune and current writer for bulls.com.
 Edward W. Stack, chairman (1977–2000) and board member, National Baseball Hall of Fame, chairman & CEO
 Andrea Stewart-Cousins, New York State Senate Majority leader.
 Glenn Taranto, actor, known for his role as Gomez Addams in The New Addams Family
 Barbara Farrell Vucanovich (R), US House of Representatives Nevada 2nd District
 Allen Weisselberg, CFO, The Trump Organization
 Suzanne Weyn, author of over forty novels, most notably, The Bar Code Tattoo and Bar Code Rebellion
 Tommy Nelson, actor, known for his role as Russell in The Cat and the Moon
 Larry Saperstein, actor, known for his role as Big Red in High School Musical: The Musical: The Series

See also
 Drumgoole Plaza
 Willem C. Vis Moot

References

Further reading
 Weigold, Marilyn E. Opportunitas: The History of Pace University. New York, NY: Pace University Press, 1991.
 History of Pace University as told by Pace University Historian Marilyn E. Weigold.
 The Pace Story

External links

 
 Pace University Athletics website

 
1906 establishments in New York (state)
Educational institutions established in 1906
Civic Center, Manhattan
Mount Pleasant, New York
Universities and colleges in Manhattan
Universities and colleges in Westchester County, New York
Briarcliff Manor, New York
Private universities and colleges in New York (state)
Private universities and colleges in New York City